The 2001–2002 FIG Rhythmic Gymnastics World Cup series was a series of stages where events in rhythmic gymnastics were contested. The series consisted of a two-year long competition, culminating at a final event — the World Cup Final in 2002. A number of qualifier stages were held. The top 3 gymnasts in each apparatus at the qualifier events would receive medals and prize money. Gymnasts that finished in the top 8 also received points which were added up to a ranking that qualified for the biennial World Cup Final.

Stages
Besides specific World Cup stages, the 2001 World Championships was also part of the 2001–2002 World Cup series.

Medalists

All-around

Rope

Hoop

Ball

Clubs

See also
 2001–2002 FIG Artistic Gymnastics World Cup series

References

Rhythmic Gymnastics World Cup
2001 in gymnastics
2002 in gymnastics